Domjur Assembly constituency is a legislative assembly constituency in Howrah district in the Indian state of West Bengal.

Overview
As per orders of the Delimitation Commission, No. 184 Domjur Assembly constituency  is composed of the following: Bally Jagachha community development block and Bankra I, Bankra II, Bankra III, Makardah II, Narna, Shalap I and Shalap II gram panchayats of Domjur community development block.

Domjur Assembly constituency is part of No. 27 Sreerampur (Lok Sabha constituency). Domjur was earlier (until 2008) part of Howrah (Lok Sabha constituency).

Members of Vidhan Sabha

Election results

2021

2016

2011

1977-2006
In the 2006 state assembly elections Mohanta Chatterjee Das of CPI(M) won the Domjur seat defeating his nearest rival Rajib Kuntal Banerjee of Trinamool Congress. Contests in most years were multi cornered but only winners and runners are being mentioned. Padma Nidhi Dhar of CPI(M) defeated Brajamohan Majumdar of Trinamool Congress in 2001, Bhabani Prasad Bhattacharya of Congress in 1996, and Sachin Ray of Congress in 1991. Joykesh Mukherjee of CPI(M) defeated Sachin Ray of Congress in 1987, Mahadeb Manna of Congress in 1982, and Krishna Pada Roy of Congress in 1977.

1951-1972
Krishna Pada Roy of Congress won in 1972. Joykesh Mukherjee of CPI(M) won in 1971 and 1969. A.H.Mondal of Congress won in 1967. Tarapada Dey of CPI won in 1962, 1957 and in independent India's first election in 1951.

References

Assembly constituencies of West Bengal
Politics of Howrah district
1952 establishments in West Bengal
Constituencies established in 1952